Aziz Tazi  is a Moroccan film writer, director and producer featured in Forbes Africas 30 Under 30. Tazi made his directorial debut with the feature film Night Walk. The crime drama was acquired by Lionsgate and is the first Moroccan film in history to get Hollywood distribution.

Prior to Night Walk, Tazi's short film Imago opened the Arab Film Festival in 2013. His documentary Arab Stories aired on PBS in 2014. Tazi has also directed music videos for French rapper La Fouine. Variety and The Huffington Post have covered his work as well.

Early life 
Aziz Tazi grew up in Casablanca, Morocco. At 14, he used Adobe Premiere Pro and Adobe After Effects, along with 3D Studio Max to create 15-min short videos based on the game Counter-Strike. The videos went viral and some were awarded "Best Visual Effects" and "Most Innovative" by a gaming website after he turned 15.

Eventually, Tazi settled in California after graduating with two Masters of Science from Ecole Centrale Paris and UC Berkeley.

Career 
In 2011, Tazi directed a documentary short called "Emilie" about France's first-ever female Olympic champion in gymnastics Emilie Le Pennec. The short won the "Orange Reporter" Award for Highest Achievement in Creativity.

In 2012, he received funding from his engineering school Ecole Centrale Paris and French bank BNP Paribas to direct and produce his first narrative short Imago. This psychological thriller opened the Arab Film Festival in Los Angeles in 2013. In 2013, while attending the University of California at Berkeley, he made a documentary about successful Arab leaders in the U.S. called "Arab Stories: Bay Area," which aired on PBS.

After working as a creative director for the Center for Entrepreneurship and Technology, working to make UC Berkeley's entrepreneurship education available online, Tazi moved to Los Angeles where he became the festival manager of the Arab Film Festival. He has been featured on the cover of Morocco's Challenge magazine.

Tazi also worked on his first feature film Night Walk as director. The film had its World Premiere at the Moscow International Film Festival in April 2019. Later that year, Tazi won the "Best Screenplay" award at the Prague Independent Film Festival. In a 2019 interview with Piers Morgan on Good Morning Britain, Mickey Rourke spoke of his experience working with Tazi, praising "the enthusiasm of this guy who was only 28" and added that “he wasn't terrified to work with me, he was just very excited to work with me."

Recognition 

In 2013, Tazi was voted among "Top 50 Men of the Year 2013" by VH Magazine.

Tazi was also featured on Forbes Africas 30 Under 30 in 2016 as a leading change-maker under the age of 30.

In 2021, Spectrum News aired a 2-min segment on Tazi's work as a director challenging the stereotypes around the Arab and Muslim community in the West that played nationwide every hour for a day. The Washington Post and Entertainment Weekly also included his film Night Walk in their "Movies to Stream this Week" list.

Filmography

Features 

 Night Walk (2021)

Shorts 
 Emilie (2011)
 Imago (2013)
 Arab Stories (2014)
 The Passing (2014)

Music videos 
 "Stop" by Imad Kotbi featuring Ryan McTogy (2017)
 "Love & Devotion" by Imad Kotbi featuring Ryan McTogy (2017)
 "African Queen" by La Fouine (2018)
 "Daqqat Qelbi (My Heartbeat)" by Ghita Lahmamssi (2019)

Awards and nominations

References

External links 
 

Year of birth missing (living people)
Living people
People from Casablanca
Moroccan film directors
University of California, Berkeley alumni
École Centrale Paris alumni